Nepes Gukulov (born 10 September 1978) is a retired Greco-Roman wrestler from Turkmenistan. He represented his country at the 2000 Summer Olympics in Sydney as a featherweight (-58 kg), finishing 10th overall (with a 1-2 record).

He is also the only Turkmen to ever medal at the World Wrestling Championships, winning a silver in 2002 in Moscow at -55 kg. He defeated defending world champion Hassan Rangraz in the semifinals before losing to Geidar Mamedaliyev in the gold medal match.

References

External links
 Sports-Reference profile
 Wrestling Database profile

Living people
1978 births
Turkmenistan male sport wrestlers
Olympic wrestlers of Turkmenistan
Wrestlers at the 2000 Summer Olympics
World Wrestling Championships medalists
Wrestlers at the 1998 Asian Games
Asian Games competitors for Turkmenistan